Stik is a British graffiti artist based in London. He is known for painting large stick figures.

Overview
Stik paints stick figure-like people as street art. He began in London, working in its northeast area of Hackney, especially in Shoreditch, "and now paints murals all over the world in Europe, Asia and America."

He liaises at the Central Saint Martins Graffiti Dialogues and has been funded to run graffiti workshops. He has worked with Amnesty International, British Waterways, the Mutoid Waste Company, Queeruption, and Reclaim the Streets. He paints unauthorised art as well as pieces that are authorised.

In 2011, Stik had a solo show at Imitate Modern, a gallery in London's West End. In 2012, he worked in Dulwich, southeast London in collaboration with curator Ingrid Beazley, where he recreated Old Master paintings in his own style that were exhibited in Dulwich Picture Gallery. This led to further street artists including Conor Harrington, MadC, Mear One, Thierry Noir, Francisco Rodrigues da Silva (Nunca), Phlegm, James Reka (Reka One), Remi Rough and System, and ROA, becoming involved to form the Dulwich Outdoor Gallery of street art around the Dulwich area in 2013. In February 2013 he collaborated with Noir in Shoreditch.

In April 2012, the London Evening Standard reported that "he was living in a St Mungo’s hostel for the homeless last year as he prepared for his first gallery show."

In March 2013 Stik gave away poster copies of his art via The Big Issue. The BBC said at the time that in "the last two years, Stik's fame has grown with celebrity endorsements and rising auction prices. One of his works, a sculpture titled ‘Up On The Roof’, fetched £150,000 at auction.

Publications
Stik. Century, 2015. .

See also
 List of street artists

References

External links

Year of birth missing (living people)
Living people
Artists from London
English graffiti artists